Brittany Leighton Force (born July 8, 1986) is an NHRA drag racer and 2-time NHRA Drag Racing Series Top Fuel dragster champion. She is the daughter of drag racer John Force and the sister of fellow racers Courtney Force and Ashley Force Hood.

Career

Force became an NHRA drag racer in 2013, driving a Top Fuel dragster, the first John Force Racing driver to compete in that class. She is sponsored by Monster Energy. In 2016, she became the first woman to win the NHRA Four-Wide Nationals. On May 20, 2016, she set a new NHRA top fuel drag racing record with a run of 3.676 seconds over 1,000 feet at Heartland Park Topeka, Kansas.

 In 2017, Force became the second woman in history to win a Top Fuel Championship, after Shirley Muldowney in 1982, clinching the title in the quarterfinals of the final race of the season before going on to win the event. Force won 4 races for the year, the most in a single season in her career, including 3 in the Countdown to the Championship.

In 2019, Force became the first woman driver to be the Number 1 qualifier in Top Fuel at the U.S. Nationals.

On Oct 2, 2022 Force set the national record with fastest top fuel run in history at 338.17 mph at the NHRA Midwest Nationals.
Brittany won the 2022 NHRA TopFuel championship. Brittany has 16 career NHRA wins.

Personal life

Force attended California State University, Fullerton, where she received a degree in education.

Brittany's hobbies include traveling, cooking, hot yoga, jogging, reading, going to the beach or watching movies.

References

External links

1986 births
American female racing drivers
Female dragster drivers
Force family
Living people
People from Yorba Linda, California